Svetozar Koljević (9 September 1930 – 29 May 2016) was a Serbian author, historian, translator, and professor, member of the Serbian Academy of Sciences and Arts and Academy of Sciences and Arts of the Republika Srpska. He was the elder brother of Nikola Koljević. His studies focused on South Slavic epic poetry.

Work
The Epic in the Making (Oxford, 1980),

References

1930 births
2016 deaths
20th-century Serbian historians
Yugoslav historians
People from Banja Luka
Serbs of Bosnia and Herzegovina
Serbian translators
Members of the Serbian Academy of Sciences and Arts
Members of the Academy of Sciences and Arts of the Republika Srpska
20th-century translators